George Fountain Bickford (9 January 1927 – 30 November 2009) was an Australian rules football player. Bickford was a member of the Melbourne premiership team in 1948 and was educated at Wesley College, Melbourne.

Personal life
Bickford served as an ordinary seaman in the Royal Australian Navy during the Second World War.

References

George Bickford's obituary

External links

DemonWiki profile

Melbourne Football Club players
1927 births
2009 deaths
People educated at Wesley College (Victoria)
Australian rules footballers from Melbourne
Royal Australian Navy personnel of World War II
Royal Australian Navy sailors
Melbourne Football Club Premiership players
One-time VFL/AFL Premiership players
People from Glen Iris, Victoria
Military personnel from Melbourne